Frontline Pilipinas is a Philippine television newscast broadcast by TV5, Originally anchored by Raffy Tulfo and Cheryl Cosim, the program premiered on October 5, 2020, succeeding Aksyon. It is also simulcast on One News, One PH, 92.3 Radyo5 True FM, and online via livestreaming on Facebook, YouTube, and News5's official website. Currently, Cosim and Julius Babao serve as the main anchors.

The newscast, along with other News5 programs, continues the tradition of sign language interpretation that News5 pioneered during the launch of now-defunct Aksyon a decade earlier.

History

2020–2021: Tulfo-Cosim era
Frontline Pilipinas premiered on October 5, 2020, at 6:30 p.m. with Raffy Tulfo and Cheryl Cosim as original anchors, along with News5 chief Luchi Cruz-Valdes, chief correspondent Ed Lingao, and Lourd de Veyra as segment anchors for Deretsahan, NEWS ExplainED, and Word of the Lourd, respectively. The program serves as the replacement to TV5's longest-running flagship newscast Aksyon, which ended abruptly on March 13, 2020, due to the COVID-19 pandemic the enforcement of enhanced community quarantine in Luzon, as well as the two One- branded newscasts which aired on TV5. The following week, the program moved to 6:00 p.m. timeslot to give way for the 2020 PBA Philippine Cup and new primetime programming.

On February 15, 2021, athlete and TV host Gretchen Ho joined the newscast as Sports segment anchor (alongside The Big Story on One News.) On February 22, 2021, the program extended its running time to 1 hour and 15 minutes as part of TV5's programming changes.

On April 5, 2021, the program moved to 5:30 p.m. with a shortened 1 hour running time to give way for the new shows Sing Galing! and Niña Niño. On July 16, 2021, the show cut it's airtime to 30 minutes on Wednesdays and Fridays to give way to the broadcast of the 2021 PBA season.

On September 20, 2021, the newscast moved to an earlier timeslot from 5:15 p.m. to 6:30 p.m. with 1 hour and 15 minutes every Mondays, Tuesdays, and Thursdays. Timeslots for Wednesdays and Fridays remain at 5:15 p.m. and extended to 45 minutes.

Tulfo's departure
On October 1, 2021, Raffy Tulfo bid farewell to the newscast to run for senator and his brother Erwin to run for Partylist in 2022, leaving Cosim as the sole anchor starting October 4.

2022–present: Cosim-Babao era
Julius Babao was named as Raffy Tulfo's replacement, joining the newscast on February 7, 2022. In conjunction with this, Frontline Pilipinas also debuted its new opening billboard, title card, and graphics. Babao was originally to make his debut on January 17, but was postponed due to the increasing number of COVID-19 cases brought by the omicron variant. Ed Lingao took over as interim anchor of the newscast.

Also on the same day, Gretchen Ho took over the anchoring duties for Frontline sa Umaga from Paolo Bediones as he left News5 on February 1 due to the issues surrounding his company, Ei2Tech.

Newscast editions

Frontline Pilipinas (Primetime edition)

Weekday main anchors
 Cheryl Cosim (since 2020)
 Julius Babao (since 2022)

Segment presenters
 Ed Lingao 
 Lourd de Veyra 
 Gretchen Ho 
 MJ Marfori

Former anchor
 Raffy Tulfo

Segments
 Una Sa Lahat (Intro)
 Abroad (World)
 News ExplainED (Explainer)
 Special Report
 Showbiz (Entertainment)
 Sports
 Word of the Lourd (Editorial)

Frontline sa Umaga (Morning edition)

Frontline sa Umaga, a morning edition of Frontline Pilipinas, premiered on May 10, 2021, with Paolo Bediones and Marga Vargas as its original anchors. Airing on the network's morning block, it succeeded Aksyon sa Umaga. The program first aired at 6:00 a.m. for 30 minutes from May 10 to October 1, 2021.

On October 4, 2021, the program moved to a new timeslot at 10:50 a.m. and was extended to 40 mins, filling the vacancy left by Idol in Action; its original timeslot was succeeded by the replays of One PH's Mag-Badyet Tayo! and the 30-minute simulcast of Ted Failon at DJ Chacha sa Radyo5.

On December 24, 2021. Vargas left the newscast and was filled in occasionally by Maricel Halili. On January 17, Bediones left the newscast due to pending lawsuits filed by ex-employees of Ei2 Technologies, Inc. Maricel Halili served as the interim anchor.

On February 7, 2022, Gretchen Ho joined the newscast as the main anchor.

On April 18, 2022, the newscast moved to an earlier timeslot, at 10:00 a.m., to give way for Lakwatsika.

On January 9, 2023, Jes Delos Santos will also serve as main anchor alongside Ho.

Main anchors
 Gretchen Ho  
 Jes Delos Santos

Former anchors
 Paolo Bediones 
 Marga Vargas

Segments
 Una Sa Lahat (Intro)
 Abroad (World)
 Happy News (Features)
 Showbiz (Entertainment)
 Sports
 Frontline Pilipinas Mamaya

Frontline Tonight (Late-night edition)

Frontline Tonight, a late-night news edition of Frontline Pilipinas, premiered on September 27, 2021. on the network's TodoMax Primetime Singko evening block. It is anchored by Ed Lingao, and Maeanne Los Baños. It is TV5's first flagship late-night newscast since Aksyon Tonite. It is also simulcast on One News.

Main anchors
 Ed Lingao 
 Maeanne Los Baños

Segments
 Una Sa Lahat (Intro)
 News ExplainED (Explainer)
 Fact Checked
 Special Report
 Abroad (World)
 Frontline Balita (Top Stories)
 Showbiz (Entertainment)
 Sports
 Pampa-Good Night (Features)

News5 Alerts

News5 Alerts is an hourly news bulletin of TV5 that premiered on October 5, 2020, replacing Aksyon Alerts.

Presenters
 Cherry Bayle (weekdays) 
 Maricel Halili (weekends)

Regional editions
 Dateline Zamboanga (Zamboanga) (co-produced by Golden Broadcast Professionals)
 Frontline Eastern Visayas (Tacloban) (co-produced by Allied Broadcasting Center)

Accolades
Frontline Pilipinas received nominations for Best News Program and Best Female Newscaster at the 35th PMPC Star Awards for Television.

References

External links
 Official website

2020 Philippine television series debuts
Filipino-language television shows
Flagship evening news shows
TV5 (Philippine TV network) news shows
News5 shows
Philippine television news shows
Sign language television shows